The Anatolian crested newt (Triturus anatolicus) is a newt species endemic to northern Anatolia in Turkey. Before its description in 2016, it was first considered to belong to the southern crested newt (Triturus karelinii) and then the Balkan crested newt (Triturus ivanbureschi). The three species form a complex of morphologically indistinguishable cryptic species. Genetic data demonstrated the Anatolian crested newt to be distinct from the other two species, although it hybridises with the Balkan crested newt at its western range end.

With its two closely related species, the Anatolian crested newt is more stockily built than the other crested newts, and reaches 10–13 cm in length. It is semiaquatic, spending most of the year on land and only returning to water for breeding. The species does not seem to be immediately threatened, although a formal IUCN Red List assessment has not been conducted yet.

Systematics and taxonomy

The Anatolian crested newt was described by Ben Wielstra and Jan Willem Arntzen in 2016. Mitochondrial DNA data had already suggested that it was a separate species in a 2013 study, but the authors had preferred to await a more detailed analysis before formal species description and temporarily included it in the Balkan crested newt (Triturus ivanbureschi), which had been split from the southern crested newt (T. karelinii). Nuclear DNA analysis then confirmed that its populations form a distinct gene pool, although it detected a hybrid zone where the species' range borders that of its sister species, the Balkan crested newt, in western Anatolia.

Description

No morphological criteria are known to distinguish the Anatolian crested newt from the Balkan and the southern crested newt; the three are cryptic species. Like the other two closely related species, it is a rather stout newt which measures  and has 12–13 rib-bearing vertebrae. Its back and sides are brown–black with darker spots; the underside is orange with black blotches whose pattern is variable among individuals. Females do not develop a crest and swollen cloaca, and have a smaller tail fin during the aquatic phase.

Distribution and habitats

Behaviour and ecology

Like other Triturus species, the Anatolian crested newt initially develops in the water, but spends most of the year in shady habitats on land as an adult. It returns to breeding ponds every year, where males develop a conspicuous dorsal crests and court the females. Eggs are folded in leaves of water plants.

Threats and conservation

The Anatolian and the Balkan crested newt, split only recently from the southern crested newt, have not yet gone through a Red List assessment according to the International Union for Conservation of Nature's criteria. A previous assessment reported the southern crested newt, including both now-accepted species, as widespread, with no immediate threats known, in Turkey.

All crested newts are listed in the Bern Convention (appendix II) and the EU Habitats Directive (annex II and IV), which prohibit capture, disturbance, killing, trade, and destruction of habitats.

See also

References

External links

Triturus
Amphibians of Turkey
Endemic fauna of Turkey
Amphibians described in 2016
Taxobox binomials not recognized by IUCN